Conrad Montgomery Avondale Mainwaring (born 2 October 1951) is an Antigua and Barbuda former hurdler. He competed in the men's 110 metres hurdles at the 1976 Summer Olympics.

Mainwaring has been embroiled in a series of scandals in which many athletes he coached during his days as a track coach at various education institutions across the U.S. claimed that he had committed sexual abuse. As of 2022, Mainwaring is facing three counts of indecent assault and battery on a child under the age of 14, and nine counts of indecent assault and battery on a child over the age of 14 in Berkshire County, Massachusetts.

References

External links
 

1951 births
Living people
Athletes (track and field) at the 1976 Summer Olympics
Antigua and Barbuda male hurdlers
Olympic athletes of Antigua and Barbuda
Place of birth missing (living people)